Nariyah, No'ayriyah, Nariya or An Nariyah is a town situated at Eastern Province, Saudi Arabia. It has approximate total area of approximately 25 square km. It is located 150 km away from Jubail . It has a population over 60,000 (2017 Census).

Transportation

Airport
The city is served by King Fahd International Airport, the terminal is at a driving distance of 190 km to the south east.

See also 

 List of cities and towns in Saudi Arabia

Populated places in Eastern Province, Saudi Arabia